George Abbot may refer to:

 George Abbot (bishop) (1562–1633), English clergyman who became Archbishop of Canterbury
 George Abbot (author) (c. 1603–1649), English writer and MP for Tamworth in the Short and Long parliaments
 George Abbotts (1602–1645), or Abbot, MP for Gilford in the Short and Long parliaments (nephew of the Archbishop George Abbot)

See also 
 George Abbitt (1634–1689), was a founding settler of Norwalk, Connecticut
 George Abbot School, Burpham, Guildford, Surrey, England
 George Abbott (disambiguation)
 Abbot (surname)